This is a list of flag bearers who have represented Ivory Coast at the Olympics.

Flag bearers carry the national flag of their country at the opening ceremony of the Olympic Games.

See also
 Ivory Coast at the Olympics

References

Ivory Coast at the Olympics
Ivory Coast
Olympic flagbearers
Olympic flagbearers